Shame is a 1921 American film directed by Emmett J. Flynn. It is based on the story Clung by Max Brand, which appeared in the magazine All Story Weekly (10 Apr - 15 May 1920 edition). This black and white silent film was distributed and produced by Fox Film Corporation. It is considered a drama and has a runtime of 90 mins. It is presumed to be a lost film.

Plot
William Fielding, a missionary in China, loses his wife after she gives birth to a son named David. He then marries a Chinese woman named Lotus Blossom, who treats the child as if it were her own. A trader named Foo Chang is madly in love with the woman. Believing  the child to be hers, he kills William and brands David. Lotus Blossom commits suicide as a result. However, Li Chung, aware of the child's true parentage, takes David to the home of his wealthy grandfather in San Francisco. There, the boy befriends Li Chung and later inherits his grandfather's business and the Fielding estate when he becomes older.

David marries an American woman named Winifred Wellington. Following David's marriage, however, Foo Chang appears. He is now the head of an opium ring and tries to bribe David to help him bring a cargo of opium into the city. When David refuses, Foo Chang tells David that he is half-Chinese. Although he has no proof other than the brand on David's arm, that is enough to convince David. He goes to pieces and flees with his infant son to Alaska.

Winifred goes to Li Chung, who kills Foo Chang and also promises to take her to David but not telling her about her husband's true ethnicity. Li Chung only reveals the truth when Winifred is reunited with her husband. The family returns to San Francisco to live happily ever after.

Cast
John Gilbert as William Fielding / David Field
Michael D. Moore as David, age 5 (credited as Mickey Moore)
Frankie Lee as David, age 10
George Siegmann as Foo Chang
William V. Mong as Li Clung
George Nichols as Jonathan Fielding
Anna May Wong as Lotus Blossom
Rosemary Theby as The Weaver of Dreams
Doris Pawn as Winifred Wellington
David Kirby as 'Once-over' Jake (credited as 'Red' Kirby)

References

External links

1921 films
American black-and-white films
American silent feature films
Films directed by Emmett J. Flynn
Silent American drama films
1921 drama films
Fox Film films
Lost American films
Films with screenplays by Bernard McConville
1921 lost films
Lost drama films
1920s American films